Kim Ryon-hyang  (born 4 May 1992) is a North Korean alpine skier. 
She competed in slalom and giant slalom at the 2018 Winter Olympics.

References

1992 births
Living people
North Korean female alpine skiers 
Olympic alpine skiers of North Korea 
Alpine skiers at the 2018 Winter Olympics